The Brigadier General Robert L. Denig Memorial Distinguished Performance Award is presented annually by the United States Marine Corps Combat Correspondents Association. It is named for the Marine Corps' first Director of Public Information, Brigadier General Robert L. Denig.

The award is made to civilians who have made an especially significant contribution to the perpetuation of the ideals, traditions, stature and achievements of the United States Marine Corps.

Award Recipients
 2016 Col. John “Doc” Church
 2015 Georgette Louise “Dickey” Chapelle
 2014
 2013 Francis “Bing” West
 2012 Dr. Linda Canup Keaton-Lima
 2011 Charles “Chip” Jones
 2010 Tom Hanks
 2009 Col. John Grider Miller (USMC Ret.)
 2008 James “Jim” Brady
 2007 James “Jim” Lehrer
 2006 Walter Ford
 2001 Joseph L. Galloway
 2000 James Bradley

References

American non-fiction literary awards